A. K. M. Fazlul Haque (born 25 January 1958) is a Bangladeshi surgeon. He was the founder of the Department of Colorectal Surgery in Bangabandhu Sheikh Mujib Medical University (BSMMU) in Dhaka.

Early life and education
Haque was born on 25 January in 1958 in Gazipura village in Patuakhali district of East Pakistan. His father is  Rashid Ahmed.

Haque passed Secondary School Certificate (SSC) from Jessore board at 1972. In 1974, he completed Higher Secondary School Certificate (HSC). In 1982, he completed his M.B.B.S degree from Dhaka Medical College. He was awarded Fellowship (FCPS) from Bangladesh College of Physicians and Surgeons in January 1989.

Career
Haque worked in government and private health service in Bangladesh starting from April 1982 until 2021. He practices absolutely restricted Colorectal Surgery since 1997. In last 18 years he has consulted nearly 9,50,000 (Nine lac fifty thousand) new patients and operated 5,35,000 (Five lac thirty five thousand) patients in private and government's hospital having piles, fistula, anal fissure, colon cancer and rectal cancer, polyp, rectal prolapse & diverticulitis. He does short or full colonoscopy himself routinely for most of the patient. He has attended many conferences at home and abroad. He has conducted few international workshops. He was a visiting faculty in Tribhubon University, Nepal. He performed successfully the highest number of operation worldwide for piles, fistula, anal fissure, colon cancer, rectum cancer.

Contributions
Haque is the founder chairman of colorectal surgery in Bangabandhu Sheikh Mujib Medical University. It may be specially mentioned that Professor Haque is the pioneer in colorectal Surgery in Bangladesh and the Subcontinent. He successfully initiated various modern surgeries of colon and rectum. Such as double stapling of rectum cancer, Longo operation for Haemorrhoid and successful operation of fistula after having frequent unsuccessful operations. Professor Haque popularised the idea of treating 70-80% of Haemorrhoid patients with the non-operation procedure such as Rubber Ring Ligation. He has taken the initiative to observe "World Piles & Colorectal Cancer Day" on 20 November in Bangladesh and internationally to increase public awareness. In 2006 he started "MS degree" in colorectal surgery in Bangabandhu Sheikh Mujib Medical University (BSMMU). He has been practising the colorectal surgery for many years.

Haque is the first in the history of Bangladesh who directed international training course for senior foreign specialists in May 2008. Surgeons from Sri Lanka, Nepal, India and Maldives attended the international training program "Titled: Master program in MIPH". In this program, he trained them practically how to perform Longo operation skillfully without any trauma to the anal canal exterior.

Membership
Member, American Society of Colon & Rectal Surgeons
Member, Endoscopic & Laparoscopic Surgeons of Asia, ELSA, SINGAPORE
Life Member, Bangladesh College of Physicians & Surgeons
Life Member, Society of Surgeons of Bangladesh
Life Member, Bangladesh Medical Association

Books and publications
Haque has written a book on colorectal surgery for public which is widely circulated. He has started few operations in Bangladesh for the first time namely Low anterior resection with double stapling, Longo operation and complex fistula operation with seton technique.

Personal life
Haque's wife Shahin Mahbuba Haque is a professor of English. In addition to that, she is a singer as well as English news presenter of Bangladesh Television. His eldest son Asif Almas Haque completed MBBS(SSMC),MRCS(ENG),FCPS(Surgery),FRCS(ENG),Fellow of American College of Surgeons(FACS),Fellow of American Society of Colon&Rectal Surgeons(FASCRS). His younger son Sakib Sarwat Haque completed MBBS(BMC).

References

1958 births
Living people
Bangladeshi medical researchers
Bangladeshi colorectal surgeons
Place of birth missing (living people)
Dhaka Medical College alumni